All the Light We Cannot See is an upcoming drama limited series directed by Shawn Levy for Netflix. Based on Anthony Doerr's Pulitzer Prize winning novel of the same name, it stars Aria Mia Loberti, Mark Ruffalo and Hugh Laurie. The four-part series follows the stories of a blind French teen girl named Marie-Laure and a German soldier named Werner, whose paths cross in occupied France during World War II.

Premise 
All the Light We Cannot See follows the lives of two teenagers during the height of World War II − Marie-Laure, a blind French girl and Werner Pfennig, a German boy forced to join and fight for the Nazi Regime.

Cast and characters

Main 

 Aria Mia Loberti as Marie-Laure LeBlanc, a blind French teenage girl and daughter of Daniel LeBlanc
 Nell Sutton as Young Marie-Laure LeBlanc 
 Mark Ruffalo as Daniel LeBlanc, father of Marie-Laure and locksmith at the Museum of Natural History in Paris
 Hugh Laurie as Etienne LeBlanc, a reclusive PTSD suffering World War I veteran and great-uncle of Marie-Laure
 Louis Hofmann as Werner Pfennig
 Lars Eidinger as Sergeant Major Reinhold von Rumpel
 Andrea Deck as Sandrina

Production 
In March 2019, Netflix and 21 Laps Entertainment acquired the rights to develop a limited television series adaptation of the novel with Shawn Levy, Dan Levine and Josh Barry executive producing. In September 2021, it was announced that Netflix had given the production a series order consisting of four episodes, with Steven Knight writing the series and Levy directing all episodes. In December 2021, it was announced that Aria Mia Loberti would play as Marie-Laure.

In January 2022, it was announced that both Mark Ruffalo and Hugh Laurie joined the cast, set as leads opposed to Loberti. Ruffalo is set to portray Daniel LeBlanc, while Laurie will portray Etienne LeBlanc.

In February 2022, it was announced that Louis Hofmann, Lars Eidinger and Nell Sutton joined the cast.

Composer James Newton Howard will write the musical score for the series.

Filming took place between March and July 2022 on three main locations: Budapest, Saint-Malo,the main scenes (street, bombings, Saint-Malo liberation scene) were filmed in the town of Villefranche-de-Rouergue (Aveyron department, south of France). This town was chosen for its ancient central square similar to Saint-Malo's before World War Two destructions and for its typical streets, 1940s style. The shooting in Villefranche-de-Rouergue took place from July 5 to 20, 2022. A large part of the town was adapted for the production needs.

References

External links 

 

2020s American drama television miniseries
English-language television shows
Fiction about diseases and disorders
Nonlinear narrative television series
Television series created by Steven Knight
Television series based on American novels
Television series about families
Television series about Nazis
Television shows about blind people
Television shows filmed in Budapest
Television shows filmed in France
Television shows set in Paris
Upcoming drama television series
Upcoming Netflix original programming
World War II television drama series